Cecilia Medina Quiroga (born 1935 in Concepción) is a Chilean jurist.

Biography

Cecilia Medina studied legal and social sciences at the University of Chile in Santiago and earned a doctorate in law at the University of Utrecht in the Netherlands.

From 1995 to 2002 she was a member of the United Nations Human Rights Committee, including a period as its chair in 1999–2000. While on the Human Rights Committee she authored its General Comment 28  on the rights of men and women as set out in Article 3 of the International Covenant on Civil and Political Rights.

In 2004 she was elected to the Inter-American Court of Human Rights, serving as its vice president in 2007 and as its president for the 2008–09 period (the first time a woman has held the office).  In 2004 she also became a member of the International Commission of Jurists. In 2006 she was awarded the Gruber Prize for Women's Rights.

In December 2006, the United Nations Human Rights Council selected her for the group of independent experts assigned to investigate the November 2006 Beit Hanoun incident.

She is a co-director, with José Zalaquett, of the University of Chile's Human Rights Centre, where she organises a postgraduate course on women's rights for practising lawyers. 
She has also taught at Lund University, the International Institute of Human Rights, the University of Toronto, the United Nations University for Peace, the University of Utrecht and Harvard University, and has published extensively on human rights issues.

External links
Judge Cecilia Medina Quiroga, Inter-American Court

1935 births
Harvard University staff
United Nations Human Rights Committee members
People from Concepción, Chile
Living people
Chilean women lawyers
Inter-American Court of Human Rights judges
Chilean officials of the United Nations
Chilean judges of international courts and tribunals
20th-century Chilean lawyers
21st-century Chilean judges
20th-century women lawyers
21st-century women judges